The American Forces Network (AFN) is a government television and radio broadcast service the U.S. military provides to those stationed or assigned overseas. Headquartered at Fort George G. Meade, Maryland, AFN's broadcast operations, which include global radio and television satellite feeds, emanate from the AFN Broadcast Center/Defense Media Center in Riverside, California. AFN was founded on 26 May 1942, in London as the Armed Forces Radio Service (AFRS).

History
The American Forces Network can trace its origins to 26 May 1942, when the War Department established the Armed Forces Radio Service (AFRS). A television service was first introduced in 1954 with a pilot station at Limestone Air Force Base, Maine. In 1954, the television mission of AFRS was officially recognized and AFRS (Armed Forces Radio Service) became AFRTS (Armed Forces Radio and Television Service). All of the Armed Forces broadcasting affiliates worldwide merged under the AFN banner on 1 January 1998. On 21 November 2000, the American Forces Information Service directed a change of the AFRTS organizational title from Armed Forces Radio and Television Service back to American Forces Radio and Television Service. A timeline of the history of AFN is available online.

Origins
KODK began broadcasting from the U.S. Army base Fort Greely at Kodiak, Alaska, before the inception of the AFRS. Fort Greeley was built to defend and was an integral part of the Kodiak Naval Air Station, sometimes called Naval Operating Base. Construction of both was under way in 1940. The naval station and AFRS radio remained in operation, but Fort Greely closed at the end of World War II. Years later the name Fort Greely was resurrected for the Big Delta (near Delta Junction) Army base. The small town of Kodiak, located six miles away, had no radio station, while Anchorage and Fairbanks, where Army and Army Air Force bases soon would be established, had civilian radio stations. Thus KODK had a primary role to bring radio to the armed forces and civilians in the Kodiak area.  The sign-off at KODK was the memorable "Goodnight, Sweetheart" set to a stirring melody from Liszt's Les Preludes. The station lived on to bring the first television to Kodiak.

The first radio station began in Delta Junction, Alaska, on what was then known as Fort Greely. It was called KODK and was operated by on base personnel. In the years just before World War II, there were several radio stations based in American military bases, but none were officially recognized until 1942. The success of these individual radio stations helped pave the way for the AFN. As such, there was no single station that could be called the "first" to sign on as an AFN station. About two months before formal establishment of AFN, however, a station called "PCAN" began regular broadcast information service in the Panama Canal Zone, primarily for troops on jungle bivouac. The station, located at Fort Clayton, was later to become part of AFRS, first simply as "Armed Forces Network" located at Albrook Field.

World War II

The U.S. Army began broadcasting from London during World War II, using equipment and studio facilities borrowed from the British Broadcasting Corporation (BBC).

The first transmission to U.S. troops began at 5:45 p.m. 4 July 1943, and included less than five hours of recorded shows, a BBC News and sports broadcast.  That day, Corporal Syl Binkin became the first U.S. military broadcaster heard over the air. The signal was sent from London via telephone lines to five regional transmitters to reach U.S. troops in the United Kingdom as they made preparations for the invasion of Nazi-occupied Europe.

Fearing competition for civilian audiences, the BBC initially tried to impose restrictions on AFN broadcasts within Britain (transmissions were allowed only from American bases outside London and were limited to 50 watts of transmission power) and a minimum quota of British produced programming had to be carried. Nevertheless, AFN programs were widely enjoyed by the British civilian listeners who could receive them, and once AFN operations transferred to continental Europe (shortly after D-Day) AFN was able to broadcast with little restriction with programs available to civilian audiences across most of Europe, (including Britain), after dark.

As D-Day approached, the network joined with the BBC and the Canadian Broadcasting Corporation to develop programs especially for the Allied Expeditionary Forces. Mobile stations, complete with personnel, broadcasting equipment and a record library, were deployed to broadcast music and news to troops in the field. The mobile stations reported on front-line activities and fed the news reports back to studio locations in London.

Although the network's administrative headquarters remained in London, its operational headquarters soon moved to AFN Paris.

As Allied forces continued to push German troops back into their homeland, AFN moved east as well. The liberation of most of Western Europe saw AFN stations serving the forces liberating Biarritz, Cannes, Le Havre, Marseille, Nice, Paris and Reims.

During the period between 1943 and 1949 the AFN also broadcast programs developed through a collaboration of the Department of State's Office of the Coordinator of Inter-American Affairs and the CBS network while supporting America's cultural diplomacy initiatives. Included among the programs was Viva America which showcased leading musical talents from both North and South America and was transmitted for the benefit of armed forces throughout Europe and to South America over CBS's short wave network "La Cadena de Las Americas".

Post-war contraction and expansion

On 10 July 1945, the first AFN station in occupied Germany started broadcasting, the AFN Munich. Its first broadcast was however incorrect as it began with the sentence "Good morning! This is AFN Munich, the voice of the 7th Army!". General George S. Patton, commander of the 3rd Army, was furious with the opening as his army had taken control over Munich the previous night, and demanded that the responsible person be court-martialed.

Soon after AFN Munich signed on the air in the southern part of occupied Germany, in northern Germany, AFN Bremen begin broadcasting a few weeks later with its first radio broadcast occurring on Saturday, 28 July 1945. (In 1949, the station moved from the city of Bremen north to the port city of Bremerhaven and became AFN Bremerhaven.)

On 31 December 1945, AFN London signed off the air, and in 1948 AFN closed all its stations in France. This started the cycle of AFN stations where they would be built up during wartime, then torn down or moved after the war was over. Of the 300 stations in operation worldwide in 1945, only 60 remained in 1949.

Post-War Europe
A large number of AFN stations continued broadcasting from American bases in Europe (particularly Germany) after World War II. (Eight remain on the air today. See article on German Wikipedia.)

During the Berlin Blockade of 1948–1949, planes headed for Tempelhof in West Berlin tuned their radios to AFN-Berlin because the station's transmission tower was in the glide path to the airfield and was not jammed by the Soviets.

During the 1950s and 1960s, AFN had large civilian audiences in Europe, as European radio stations rarely played American music. In Communist countries, all radio stations were state-operated, and never played American music. Despite the language barrier, the people in those countries saw AFN as an alternative connection to the West. Also, unlike stations such as Radio Free Europe, which broadcast in Eastern European languages, AFN was not jammed by the Soviets.

Especially popular was Music in the Air, which aired on the full European network at 19:00 CET. The host was AFN Frankfurt (civilian) manager John Vrotsos, who had an especially warm baritone voice. He began each program by saying (after an introductory piano phrase from the program's theme music) "Listen ... [pause for more piano] ... there's music in the air". The theme was "Music Everywhere" in an arrangement by Victor Young. Later in the 1950s, Leroy Anderson's Belle of the ball was used. The program was popular throughout Northern Europe, especially in the liberated countries such as the Netherlands, Belgium, France (the northern part), Luxembourg and, to a lesser extent, Denmark. Many Dutch households switched to the program, also because of their positive experiences with the American liberators.
Also featured were live performances of classical music and jazz by Samuel Hans Adler's Seventh Army Symphony Orchestra in support of America's cultural diplomacy initiatives in the post war period.

In France, about a dozen AFN stations operated, with AFN Orléans as the studio control station. The network broadcast music, shows, and news relayed from AFN Frankfurt, locally produced shows, and other features aimed at the American soldiers and their families stationed in France. In particular, a whole team of reporters and technicians was sent to cover the 24-hour auto race at Le Mans, at a time when Ford was doing its best to beat the Ferraris, and finally succeeded. AFN France broadcast with 50 watt FM transmitters made by French manufacturer TRT, type OZ 305. The network employed a technical director, a program director, several military American broadcast professionals, and some French studio operators, record librarians, secretaries and maintenance technicians. The Frankfurt network programming was received, then re-fed from AFN Orléans studios to another studio-equipped affiliate, AFN Poitiers and its repeater transmitters via modulation lines rented from the French postal service. AFN Poitiers, based at Aboville Caserne, Poitiers, France, home of an Army logistical command and a major Communication Zone Signal Corps agency, served Army depots and installations in Southwestern France with locally originated programs and network feeds from AFN Orléans via Frankfurt, Germany. It was the only other studio station affiliate of AFN Orléans because of the large American military presence and its resident Department of Defense dorm school for children of American military and civilian families assigned to Poitiers, and the American installations located throughout Southwestern France. Children living in outlying American military installations and communities commuted to Poitiers once a week for daily classes and departed for home by bus and train. AFN France was dismantled in 1967, when U.S. forces left France due to the French government's decision of President (General) Charles de Gaulle to withdraw its forces from NATO's military command. The French employees were dismissed but were granted a severance pay (in French francs and taxable) of one month per year of service, paid by the U.S. Army to the French government, in dollars (all the French employees were managed by a specially created service: le Bureau d'Aide aux Armées Alliées or AAA).

Korean War
When war broke out in Korea, Army broadcasters set up in Seoul in the Banto Hotel (the old American Embassy Hotel). When the Chinese entered Seoul in December 1950, the crew moved to a mobile unit that was just completed and retreated to Daegu. Due to the large number of American troops in Korea, a number of stations were started. Mobile units followed combat units to provide news and entertainment on the radio. By the time the 1953 armistice was signed, these mobile units became buildings with transmitters, and a network, American Forces Korea Network, was born.

Canadian and American television personality Jim Perry began his broadcasting career fresh out of high school with the Armed Forces Korea Network, under his birthname of Jim Dooley, spending one year in Korea before attending the University of Pennsylvania to further his education.

Iran
An AFRTS radio station became operational in Tehran, Iran in 1959. This was followed by a television station in 1960, known as AFTV. It broadcast a radio service on 1555 kHz and a television service on Channel 7 in Tehran and the surrounding area from its studios in the city.

Its listeners (and viewers) were American military personnel stationed in Iran as part of ARMISH (the US Army mission) and Military Assistance Advisory Group (MAAG) programs. AFTV was also popular with Iranian viewers, particularly children.

As the TV service only had a power of 1000 watts, it was only on air for a few hours each day, whereas the radio service operated for around 18 hours a day. In deference to Iranian sensitivities, AFRTS avoided carrying programming that might be construed as offensive on political or religious grounds, instead carrying cowboy or detective movies.

Following the nationalization of the privately owned Television Iran network in 1969, AFTV was the only television service not in the Iranian government's hands. However, in 1976, it was decided by the Iranian government that AFRTS should close down its radio and TV services, which it did on 25 October of that year, the day before the Shah's 57th birthday.

Radio 1555 closed with presenter Air Force Staff Sergeant Barry Cantor playing Roger Whittaker's "Durham Town (The Leavin')". This was followed by a closing announcement by Chief Master Sergeant and Station Manager Bob Woodruff, ending with the U.S. national anthem:

Ladies and Gentlemen, I'm Chief Master Sergeant Bob Woodruff Station Manager of the American Forces Radio and Television Service in Tehran. After 22 years of radio broadcasting and 17 years of telecasting in Tehran, AFRTS Radio 1555 and TV Channel 7 cease all operations in this country at this time. I bid you all goodbye and thank you for letting us serve you. And now the national anthem of the United States of America."

The following day, AFRTS radio and television services in Iran were replaced by those operated by the state broadcaster National Iranian Radio and Television (NIRT), which were similar in content, appealing to the 60 000 U.S. Army and civilian personnel then stationed in Iran, as well as the wider population of foreign nationals resident in the country.

South Vietnam
As the U.S. military presence in South Vietnam increased, AFRTS opened radio and later television stations there.

AFRTS stations in Vietnam were initially known by the name "AFRS" (Armed Forces Radio Saigon), but as the number of stations quickly expanded throughout South Vietnam became known as "AFVN" (American Forces Vietnam Network) and had several stations, including Qui Nhơn, Nha Trang, Pleiku, Da Nang and Huế, the latter being overrun by the People's Army of Vietnam during the Battle of Hue in January/February 1968 and replaced by a station in Quảng Trị. AFVN's headquarters station was located in Saigon.

In Vietnam, AFVN had a number of war-related casualties. After a fierce fire fight that killed two soldiers and a civilian contractor, the remaining AFVN station staff at Huế was captured and spent five years as prisoners of war. At the height of American involvement in the war, Armed Forces Vietnam Network served more than 500,000 fighting men and women at one time. AFVN developed a program along the lines of "GI Jive" from World War II. A number of local disc jockeys helped make hourlong music programs for broadcast. Perhaps the best-known program became the morning "Dawn Buster" program, (the brainchild of Chief Petty Officer Bryant Arbuckle in 1962) thanks to the popularity of the sign-on slogan "Gooooood Morning, Vietnam" (which was initiated by Adrian Cronauer and later became the basis for the film Good Morning, Vietnam starring Robin Williams). Among the notable people who were AFVN disc jockeys were Don L. "Scotty" Brink, Lee Hansen, Les Coleman and Pat Sajak, Chris Noel and Denny Woytek. Harry Simons hosted the GO Show at both AFVN Saigon and Danang in 1968 and 1969. Simons along with broadcaster Mike Bates created and produced a 10-hour radio documentary (AFVN: The GI's Companion) as a tribute to AFVN and to honor all Vietnam Veterans. It aired and streamed on Veterans Day 2015 on WEBY Radio in Pensacola, Florida.  The documentary is archived at Rock Radio Scrapbook: AFVN: The GI's Companion.

Beginning in 1971, AFVN began to close some stations in Vietnam. The last station to close was the key station in Saigon in 1973. Broadcasting continued under civilian leadership on FM only and using the name American Radio Service (ARS). The civilian engineers were provided by Pacific Architects and Engineers (PAE). ARS stayed on the air until the Fall of Saigon in April 1975. It was to play Bing Crosby's version of Irving Berlin's "White Christmas" as a signal for Americans that the final evacuation of Saigon had begun. The Crosby version of the record could not be found so Tennessee Ernie Ford's record from 1968 was played.

Thailand
In Thailand, the Department of Defense began the planning for the Armed Forces Thailand Network in 1964 with Project Lamplighter and Project Limelight. By late 1966, implementation of the network began by the U.S. Air Force with stations on the air at Korat, U-Tapao, Ubon, Udorn, Takhli and Nahkon Phanom. In addition, there were more than 20 satellite stations that rebroadcast one or more of the primary stations, and that included one or more clandestine locations in Laos.

In April 1970, a battle-damaged RF-4C Phantom II #65-0863 returning to Udorn from a reconnaissance mission in northwest Laos, crashed into the AFTN station, killing 9 Air Force broadcasters. Pilot Leaphart and Navigator Bernholz ejected from their battle damaged plane when it went out of control on final approach. Both crewmen were injured but survived. The incident was the single worst catastrophe in the history of military broadcasting killing: TSGT Jack A Hawley, Wakeman, OH; SSGT James A. Howard, Denver, CO; A1C Andrew C. McCartney, Lakewood, OH; SSGT Alfred N. Potter, Forest Grove, OR; SGT John Charles Rose, Bloomfield, NJ; TSGT Frank D. Ryan, Jr., Mercer Island, WA; SSGT Edward W. Strain, Myrtle Beach, SC; TSGT Roy Walker, Albuquerque, NM and A1C Thomas L. Waterman, Roanoke, VA.

AFTN became the American Forces Thailand Network in the summer of 1969, and continued operations until the spring of 1976 when the remaining U.S. troops in Thailand were withdrawn at the request of the Thai government. More than 600 broadcasters from the Air Force, Navy and Army had served during the ten years that AFTN operated.

Taiwan

Before the United States and the People's Republic of China established diplomatic relations in 1979, the AFN branch in Taiwan was Armed Forces Network Taiwan (AFNT), which had a main station in Yangmingshan American Military Housing, Taipei. After the U.S. armed forces withdrew all its troops stationed in Taiwan (including the United States Taiwan Defense Command) as Washington, D.C., recognizes Beijing and broke ties with Taipei, the station was reorganized under the name of International Community Radio Taipei (ICRT) by the American Chamber of Commerce in Taipei and the ROC government. Today, ICRT is the only English-language radio service in Taiwan.

Caribbean
Then still known as the American Forces (or Armed Forces) Radio and Television Service, military bases and facilities throughout Puerto Rico received original radio programming from Army studios at Ft. Brooke in San Juan, Air Force studios at Ramey Air Force Base, and radio and television originating from Navy studios at Roosevelt Roads, in addition to local playback of stateside entertainment radio and television shows.  This broadcast service was known as AFCN, the American Forces Caribbean Network in the 1970s (later as the Armed Forces Caribbean Network) served military bases and facilities throughout Puerto Rico from transmitters in San Juan (Fort Brooke, Fort Buchanan), Roosevelt Roads Naval Station, and Ramey Air Force Base.  Each of these bases also had their own television transmitters or cable systems that played back stateside TV programming delivered to each location in weekly "packages" of 16mm film, kinescope recordings, video tape, and satellite news programming feeds.  AFCN Roosevelt Roads also produced live radio programming featuring Navy Journalist/Broadcaster disc jockeys in a Top 40 hits format, combined with programming from AFRTS Hollywood-sourced stateside shows such as American Top 40. Programming broadcast over AFCN broadcast radio and television transmitter antennas also reached some local civilian markets across Puerto Rico, such as San Juan.

Central America
Radio, and later television, to U.S. troops stationed in the Panama Canal Zone was provided initially by Armed Forces Radio (AFN) at Albrook Field and later as the Caribbean Forces Network at Fort Clayton with translators on the Atlantic side of the Canal Zone. In the early 1960s with reorganization of the command located in the Canal Zone, CFN became the Southern Command Network (SCN). SCN also broadcast to U.S. troops stationed in Honduras starting in 1987. SCN discontinued broadcasting on 1 July 1999 just before the 31 December turnover of the Canal Zone to the Republic of Panama when U.S. troops were removed from that country under the Torrijos-Carter Treaties.

AFN Honduras, which began in 1987 as SCN Honduras, now broadcasts from Soto Cano Air Base on 106.3 FM, and serves more than 600 American service members stationed at the installation, as well as numerous civilian employees and contractors. The station's primary mission is radio, originating programming including two daily live shows following the "Eagle" format. Personnel also occasionally produce video news packages. As of 15 January 2013, AFN Honduras is one of 18 stations under the operational control of AFN Europe.

Shortwave radio
With the advent of satellite broadcasting, AFRTS has shifted its emphasis away from shortwave.  Currently, the U.S. Navy provides the only shortwave single sideband shortwave AFN radio broadcasts via relay sites around the world to provide service to ships, including Diego Garcia, Guam, Naval Air Station Sigonella in Italy, Puerto Rico, Hawaii and others.

Organization
The American Forces Network (AFN) is the operational arm of the American Forces Radio and Television Service (AFRTS), an office of the Defense Media Activity (DMA). AFN falls under the operational control of the Office of the Assistant Secretary of Defense for Public Affairs (OASD-PA). Editorial control is by the Department of Defense, whereas the British Forces Broadcasting Service (BFBS), for example, is independent of the Ministry of Defence and the British armed forces.

AFN employs military broadcasters as well as Defense Department civilians and contractors. Service personnel hold broadcasting occupational specialties for their military branch.

Since 1997, all of AFN's military personnel receive primary training at the Defense Information School (DINFOS) at Fort George G. Meade in Maryland. Before 1997, DINFOS was located at Fort Benjamin Harrison in Indianapolis, Indiana. In 1997, Fort Benjamin Harrison was largely closed as a function of the 1991 Base Closure and Realignment Commission. Additional/Advanced training is also available at Fort George G. Meade.

In the 1960s, DINFOS was located at Fort Slocum, NY on a small island just off the harbor at New Rochelle. At its peak in 1965, the Army Chaplain school was also located there. In 1963 the campus operated in a "university" setting with a relaxed military environment. The Army ran the Information School although training was offered to members of all military branches. Radio types took a rather severe audition written by CBS for their network announcers. Those who survived the audition became "Broadcast Specialists" with a 703 MOS and went on to an AFRTS assignment.

Some of AFN's broadcasters have previous commercial broadcasting experience before enlisting in the military, but it is not a prerequisite for enlistment in the military as a broadcaster. During their training, the broadcasters are taught to use state-of-the-art audio and visual editing equipment similar to their civilian counterparts.

AFN management is located at DMA headquarters at Fort Meade. Day-to-day AFN broadcast operations are conducted at the AFN Broadcast Center/Defense Media Center in Riverside, California, from where all global radio and television satellite feeds emanate.

Television services

European operations
Until the early 1970s, U.S. military television service was provided in Central Europe by Air Force Television at Ramstein Air Base, Germany. In the early 1970s, AFN assumed this responsibility for the Armed Forces Radio and Television Service (AFRTS).

AFN Bremerhaven was the first AFN television station in Europe to broadcast its programming in color. The U.S. European Edition of Stars and Stripes (S&S) reported in its Thursday, 21 August 1975, edition that the AFN-Europe Commander, Lt. Col. Floyd A. McBride, announced that AFN's first color TV broadcast would begin in Bremerhaven on Monday 25 August 1975.  As S&S reported, because Bremerhaven's TV operation was so small, only a "Class C" operation, and, at the time, served only one area with TV programming, it was easy to establish the color TV broadcast operation without extensive expense or expansion.

That next year, S&S reported in its Wednesday, 23 June 1976, edition, that "the long-awaited switch to color by AFN-TV could come by the end of the year for viewers in most of West Germany. The only viewers enjoying color right now are those watching the pilot color TV station in Bremerhaven, which went on the air in…1975".

Finally, on 28 October 1976, AFN television moved from AFTV's old black-and-white studios at Ramstein to the network's new color television studios in Frankfurt. In the 1980s the network added affiliates with studio capabilities in Würzburg, Germany, and Soesterberg, the Netherlands, expanding the network to 12 affiliate stations serving American military, DOD-employed civilians and their families estimated to be well-above 350,000 stationed in West Germany, the Netherlands, and Belgium.  This was accomplished by a system of 112 microwave transmitters operated and maintained by the Army's 5th Signal Command.  Embassies and other entities of the American government without access to AFN TV signals received a 30-plus hour package mailed weekly of AFN and U.S. programming. In April, 1984 AFN began broadcasting live news, information and entertainment programming received through an 11-meter satellite dish downlink at AFN network headquarters, in addition to primetime pre-recorded shows and movies received from the Armed Forces Radio-Television Service broadcast center in Hollywood. For outlying areas, broadcast feeds of live American sports events were frequently provided by European contractors.

AFN TV was available in West Berlin until 1994. However, it was only available in the American Sector.

In 2004, AFN Europe headquarters relocated to Coleman Barracks in Mannheim, Germany.

In 2014, AFN Europe headquarters relocated to Sembach Kaserne in Sembach, Germany.

Pacific operations
Over-the-air TV for U.S. Forces in the Pacific is currently provided by AFN-Korea, AFN-Japan and AFN-Kwajalein. All local operations merged under the AFN banner effective 1 January 1998.

South Korea
AFN-Korea, formerly American Forces Korea Network (AFKN), was the largest of AFN's Pacific TV operations, although there are also AM and FM operations from military bases around Korea. AFKN began TV operations on 15 September 1957, and consisted of an originating studio at Yongsan Garrison, Seoul, and six relay transmitters throughout the peninsula. AFKN's first live television newscast aired on 4 January 1959. Until December 2007, the channel was widely available to non-military audiences on cable television, but following complaints from U.S. companies trying to sell programs in South Korea, USFK requested that the Korean Broadcasting Commission direct the removal of Pacific Prime from the Korean cable lineups. American Forces Network-Korea discontinued analog over-the-air TV broadcast 1 May 2012, due to request from the South Korean government because many local residents could receive current over-the-air U.S. network programming, resulting in decreased sales of U.S. programs to South Korean stations.

Japan
AFN-Japan, formerly the Far East Network (FEN), had one full-power VHF terrestrial TV outlet – located on Okinawa atop the Rycom Plaza Housing area in the central part of the island, AFN-Okinawa's (U.S. channel 8) TV signal served Marines, Airmen, Sailors, Soldiers, and their families stationed on-island. TV viewers on military bases in the Tokyo and Kanto Plain area of Japan can view AFN via contractor-operated base cable TV services, or through AFN Direct-To-Home (DTH) dish services if they reside off-base.

AFN-Japan's radio services consist of AM and FM stereo operations at Yokota Air Base (810 AM & cable FM), MCAS Iwakuni (1575 AM), FLTACTS Sasebo (1575 AM), Okinawa (648 AM & 89.1 FM) and Misawa Air Base (1575 AM).

AFN-Okinawa ceased over-the-air analog TV operations in 2011.

Latin America
AFN-Latin America, formerly the Las CableVision (LCV), has one full-power VHF terrestrial TV outlet. Located on HDTV.

Kwajalein Atoll
AFN-Kwajalein at the Reagan Missile Test Range on Kwajalein Atoll is the only civilian-run affiliate in AFN, broadcasting on U.S. channel 13 for military personnel and civilian contractor employees and their families. AFN-Kwajalein's signal is beamed by microwave to the nearby island of Roi-Namur and rebroadcast on channel 8.

With the availability of AFN's DTH service, terrestrial over-the-air TV broadcasts at all AFN outlets are slated for deactivation in the near future.

Gulf War
In January 1991, the network dispatched news teams and technicians to Kuwait and Saudi Arabia for Operations Desert Shield and Desert Storm. These broadcasters reported to families of soldiers deployed from Europe and staffed a number of the U.S. radio stations making up the Armed Forces Desert Network. The first song on the air after the start of the ground offensive was "Rock the Casbah" by The Clash.

Operation Iraqi Freedom

AFN-Iraq began broadcasting in December 2003 on the FM band shortly after the fall of Saddam. The first song on the air was "Freedom" by Paul McCartney. Within a short time, Freedom Radio was broadcasting on multiple FM channels from as far south as Basra to as far north as Mosul.

AFN-Iraq, Freedom Radio began as a joint effort between the Air Force, the Marines and the Army. The first unit to operate the station was the 222nd Broadcast Operations Detachment, an Army Reserve unit based in southern California. "Always There and on the Air" was the phrase that started it all, even though there were only eight hours of live radio to kick things off.

After an introduction from Lt. Gen. Ricardo Sanchez, the commander of Coalition Ground Forces in Iraq, Air Force Master Sergeant Erik Brazones was the first DJ on the air. When the 222nd BOD took the reins of the radio operations, the first two regular radio shows were Niki Cage in the Morning and Abbey in the Afternoon.  AFN-Iraq signed off in 2011.

Operation Enduring Freedom
AFN Afghanistan operated out of a building on Bagram Air Base. Its radio frequency throughout Afghanistan was 94.1 and 97.1 in Manas and produced live local shows. Its first radio transmission was at 06 o'clock 30 min on Friday, 21 July 2006. Beyond radio, AFN Afghanistan also had television news. It produced a daily five-minute newscast called Freedom Watch Afghanistan, which also aired on the Pentagon Channel.

The station was typically staffed with Air Force broadcasters but also slots Army, Navy and Marine broadcasters as well. For support there were usually four-man teams of engineers to handle all transmission, decoder and satellite issues.

Operations in Western Europe
AFN in Germany and SEB (Southern European Broadcasting) in Italy provided broadcasting to U.S. troops in Western Europe throughout the Cold War. The U.S. defense drawdown began in earnest after the Gulf War, and affected AFN stations across Europe, as many stations were consolidated or deactivated with the closing of bases. In Europe, AFN is still on the air from Tuzla, Bosnia, and Taszár, Hungary, to inform and entertain U.S. forces.

AFN went on the air 29 May  with service at the Tirana airport in Albania with satellite decoders and large-screen televisions placed in high traffic areas. At the same time, the AFN also advanced into the Yugoslav province of Kosovo along with NATO.

AFN viewers abroad witnessed live television coverage of the terrorist attacks on the United States on 11 September 2001.

During military operations in Afghanistan and Iraq AFN provided non-stop coverage of the campaigns. AFN broadcast personnel from Europe deployed with the troops to cover events. Today AFN has a staffed affiliate in Iraq, AFN-Baghdad (launched in 2003).

Wherever large numbers of U.S. troops are deployed, the AFN sets up operation, providing news and entertainment from home. Today AFN has several satellites and uses advanced digital compression technology to broadcast TV and radio to 177 countries and territories, as well as on board U.S. Navy vessels.

Media services
There have been ongoing plans for transitioning AFN TV to HDTV with an estimated completion timeframe between 2015 and 2017. So far, AFN has added one HD channel, with more being planned. However, the conversion to HD is an expensive project, so timelines and actual transition of channels is highly dependent on availability of funds. With the additional Department of Defense budget cuts looming, this project could easily be required to slip. However, AFN is continuing to research more efficient delivery methods in hopes of continuing along the planned path.

AFN's television service is broadcast in standard North American NTSC format of 525 lines. All programming delivered by satellite is PowerVu encrypted DVB. While programming is provided to AFN by major American TV networks and program syndicators at little to no cost, for copyright and licensing reasons it is intended solely for U.S. forces personnel, authorized Department of Defense civilian employees, State Department diplomatic personnel and their families overseas.

AFN-TV is available to authorized viewers by "Direct-To-Home" (DTH) service with set-top decoders purchased or leased through military exchanges (similar to a membership store), licensed/contracted commercial cable operators, purchased used from other military members (the cheapest option) or terrestrial signal. The advent of DTH service coincides with the phasing-out of AFN terrestrial TV broadcasts due to reclamation of frequencies by host nations.

AFN is considered a non-essential service, and programming ceases during government shutdowns. Sports programming to which the AFN has already purchased rights continues to be carried, as the skeleton crew operating AFN for essential programming does not save any money by blacking out the programs.

AFN programming
While the audience tunes into AFN to watch their favorite shows or listen to the latest stateside hits, entertainment is the "candy coating" used to attract the military viewer/listener. AFN's primary mission is to provide access for worldwide, regional and local command information (CI) spots, which air during commercial breaks in programming instead of commercial advertisements. These CI spots run the gamut from reminding service members to register to vote, promoting local command-sponsored recreation events and off-duty educational programs, providing health and wellness tips, and listing what's playing at local base movie theaters.

AFN also inserts public service announcements from the Ad Council. Some of the 35 overseas AFN affiliates have the capability to cover the "worldwide" CI spots placed by the AFN Broadcast Center in California with regional or locally produced CI spots (such as localized messages from senior leadership).

Many service members welcome this approach, while others find it troublesome, especially during the airing of the Super Bowl.

The network is allowed to broadcast commercial movie promotion trailers provided by the Army & Air Force Exchange Service (AAFES) and the Navy Motion Picture Service (NMPS) to promote the latest film releases in base theaters worldwide. Previously these were the only true "commercials" authorized for broadcast.

AFN Radio and TV schedules are available on the organization's website.

Radio
AFN also offers a variety of radio programming over its various frequencies throughout the world. Not only is there local programming (with military disc jockeys), but there is satellite programming, as well. Music programming spans classic rock, rhythm and blues, Jack FM and country music. Ryan Seacrest's American Top 40 (AFN The Blend), WoodSongs Old-Time Radio Hour (AFN Country), Casey Kasem's American Top 40 (AFN's Joe Radio) and the American Country Countdown with Kix Brooks (AFN Country) are broadcast weekly over AFN Radio. In addition to music, AFN broadcasts syndicated talk radio programs such as Car Talk (NPR AFN), John Tesh (Hot AC), The Bob and Sheri Show (AFN Joe Radio), Le Show (NPR AFN), Tech Nation (AFN The Voice), Kidd Kraddick in the Morning (AFN the Blend), Kim Komando (AFN The Voice), The Rush Limbaugh Show (AFN Power Talk), Delilah (AFN The Blend), The Motley Fool Radio Show (AFN The Voice), A Prairie Home Companion (NPR AFN), Doug Stephan (AFN The Voice),Titillating Sports with Rick Tittle, Sports Overnight America (AFN FANS), Mr Dad: Positive Parenting (AFN The Voice), and other programs from a variety of sources. Weekly religious programming is offered to AFN stations via closed-circuit.

On 5 December 2005, liberal/progressive Ed Schultz and conservative talk show host Sean Hannity were added to the radio programs provided by the AFN Broadcast Center to its affiliate stations. Liberal Alan Colmes rounds out the political talk lineup on The Voice channel.

On 24 April 2006, AFN Europe launched AFN The Eagle, a virtually 24-hour-a-day radio service format initially modeled after "Jack FM" but most recently a "Hot AC" format. This replaced ZFM, which had more of a contemporary hit radio flavor. When the Eagle was launched, AFN Europe took control of what local DJs could play.

Altogether, AFN produces ten general-use streams for AFN stations to use. Of these, six are music-based, two are sports-based and three general news/talk channels, including The Voice, which features live play-by-play of American sports (it's also the one heard on shortwave, if the shortwave radio has Single sideband installed). How these stations use these formats is up to them. These formats are:
 AFN The Blend (mainstream hits and yesterday's favorites, programming from Westwood One and Premiere Networks. Formerly known as "AFN Hot AC")
 AFN Country (country/western)
 AFN Gravity (urban rhythmic)
 AFN Legacy – Deep Classic Rock Gems
 AFN's Joe Radio ('80s, '90s)
 AFN Freedom Rock (Rock music)
 AFN The Voice (News, talk and information)
 AFN Clutch (sports programming from ESPN and Yahoo! Sports Radio)
 AFN Fans (sports programming from FOX Sports Radio and Sports Byline USA)
 AFN PowerTalk (liberal and conservative talk programming)
 NPR AFN (public radio programs from NPR and others)

Television
Like its radio counterpart, AFN TV tries to air programming from a variety of sources to replicate programming on a typical U.S. TV channel; sourcing from U.S. commercial networks (including PBS), and program syndicators at little to no cost since AFN does not air commercials and in that regard cannot profit from airing shows like stations in the United States can. In their place, AFN inserts public service announcements on various subjects; these can be civilian "agency spots" created by The Ad Council, nationally recognized religious and public health charities, AFN's own "command information" spots produced by the AFRTS Radio-Television Production Office (RTPO) or announcements by a regional/local AFN affiliate. The most common PSAs shown deal with sexual harassment, public health and safety, force protection/anti-terrorism, pride in service and messages to the troops.

Some people have found the AFN TV commercials to be repetitive, annoying, and condescending.

AFN produces and broadcasts eight core satellite television channels in NTSC color. They are accessible to both military and foreign service personnel abroad. All eight feeds are accessible in core areas, including but not limited to European, Korean and Japanese posts. Much of the rest of the world is limited to a smaller but more widespread naval broadcast.

Channels
Unless specified, the first telecast of each channel targets the Japan/Korea region, then replayed several hours later for the Central European time zone.
 AFN Prime. Formerly AFN Atlantic and AFN Pacific. The standard AFN feed airs current sitcoms, dramas, syndicated court shows, talk shows, game shows and reality shows popular in the United States, with a time delay from 24 hours to six months or more behind the United States airdates. In addition, popular U.S. soap operas such as General Hospital are aired by AFN on a one-week tape delay. This stream is divided into three feeds (AFN Prime Atlantic, AFN Prime Freedom (Middle East) and AFN Prime Pacific); the difference between the three is that they are time-shifted so that programs air at the same local time in each of the major regions served: Japan/Korea, Central Europe and Iraq. Many regional feeds (such as AFN-Europe and AFN-Korea) are based on AFN Prime and add local programming to it; thus, in a way, AFN Prime mimics the regular network TV concept.
 AFN Spectrum. AFN Spectrum started as more of a conservative culture-oriented channel with programming from cable networks and classic TV series. In a way, it mimicked the "superstation" concept from cablecasters TBS and WGN America. However, the Spectrum lineup currently contains more conventional programming, like American Idol and Ugly Betty, as some of the public television and classic fare that made up Spectrum is being reduced but remain the primary constant on the channel.
 AFN News. AFN News is a rolling-news channel providing news from all major news outlets.  Newscasts, such as the NBC Nightly News, Fox News, ABC World News Tonight and CBS Evening News, were all scheduled to air in the mornings so viewers could watch the headlines live, but now they air on a tape delay in the regular early evening slot, back to back.
 AFN Family/AFN Pulse. AFN Family is a general entertainment channel providing programming for children ages 2 to 17. Although the name of the channel suggests programming appropriate for all family members at any time, the channel more closely resembles Freeform or Nickelodeon, with programming targeted at specific age groups during the course of the day. Programming during after school from 3 p.m. local time to 1 a.m. local time targets pre-schoolers but "ages" as older children become available to watch in the late morning and day. By 1 a.m. local time, programming is targeted at older teens. In September 2013, AFN launched a split in Family, which was branded AFN Pulse. About half of the day's programming remains aimed at the 2-to-13 age group. During primetime hours, the channel becomes AFN Pulse, and showcases programming primarily aimed at the older teen demographic, though it remains suitable for family viewing.
 AFN Movie. AFN Movie is a channel showcasing movies as well as film-oriented programming.
 AFN Sports. AFN Sports is a rolling-sports channel, providing sports news and events, including ESPN's SportsCenter and live and delayed broadcasts of the NFL, NBA, NASCAR, MLB, NHL, NCAA college football, men and women's NCAA college basketball, FIFA soccer and PGA Tour, as well as other highly rated team competitions.
 AFN Sports 2. Launched in February 2006, as AFN Xtra. It is AFN's exclusive home for UFC and WWE programming, including all pay-per-view events, as well as motor sports, including NASCAR, NHRA, Motocross and other auto and motorcycle racing series.
 AFN Sports HD. AFN Sports is also now available in digital high definition using the new Cisco D9865 receiver/decoder.

Internet radio
In November 2013, the American Forces Network launched Internet radio streams expanding the reach of the military network's radio programming overseas.

Regional stations

AFN Europe
The internet radio stations in Europe are as follows:

AFN Pacific
The internet radio stations in the Asia-Pacific region are as follows:
 Japan

 South Korea

 Diego Garcia

AFN Go programs
AFN Go, formerly AFN 360, provides the following nine music and spoken word stations.

AFN Go's Internet streams are only made available in countries where AFN has terrestrial stations (i.e., where the U.S. armed forces have established bases) and are not available in North America. AFN Go uses IP address geolocation to determine whether a listener can access the streams. AFN stations can be accessed where it is not available through proxy servers.

AFN frequencies and transmitters by country (alphabetical)

Bahrain
Radio: AFN Bahrain
 106.3 FM: serves NSA Bahrain and Manama

Belgium

Television:

Historical data only – AFN Prime Atlantic/AFN Benelux (NTSC)
 33H: Everberg, (Kortenberg) oriented towards Evere (2 kW)
 34V: SHAPE, Casteau (4.5 kW)
 34V: Florennes (10 W)

Terrestrial transmission of the AFN TV service in Belgium ended in 2010.

Radio:
AFN Benelux – The Eagle
 101.7 FM: Everberg, Kortenberg (900 W) serving NATO HQ and much of northern Brussels Capital Region
 106.2 FM: Kleine Brogel, Peer (200 W)
 106.5 FM: SHAPE, Casteau (200 W)
 107.9 FM: Chièvres (100 W)

Cuba
Radio GTMO transmits locally for Guantanamo Bay Naval Base.

 1340 AM: News and talk radio rebroadcasts
 102.1 FM: Top 40, urban, dance, rock music
 103.1 FM: Country music

Germany

Mediumwave AM

FM

The AFN transmitters in Germany are operated by different authorities but most are operated directly by the U.S. military. Some are the property of Deutsche Telekom, while others are controlled by German public broadcasting corporations.

Greece
 106.3 MHz FM
 Souda Bay Air Base

Honduras
 106.3 MHz FM
 Soto Cano Air Base. 20 W

Iraq Freedom Radio
[All Freedom Radio–Iraq stations went off the air on 30 September 2011, as a result of the continuing draw-down of U.S. Military personnel. Listing remains to document the coverage of Iraq.]
 93.3 MHz FM
 Baghdad (FOB Union III)  –  Transmitter Never Completed
 Fallujah (Camp Baharia)
 Al Taqaddum Airbase (TQ)
 101.1 MHz FM
 Tikrit (COB Speicher)
 104.5 MHz FM
 Baquba (FOB Warhorse)  –  Transmitter Never Completed
 105.1 MHz FM
 Mosul (Camp Diamondback/FOB Marez)  –  1 kW
 107.3 MHz FM
 Al Asad Airbase
 Balad (LSA Anaconda)  –  250 W
 Nasiriyah (Tallil Air Base)  –  200 W
 Qayyarah Airfield West (Q-WEST)  –  250 W
 Ramadi (FOB Blue Diamond)
 Samarra (FOB Brassfield-Mora)
 Camp Taji
 Tall Afar (FOB Sykes)
 Umm Qasr (Camp Bucca)
 107.7 MHz FM
 Baghdad (Camp Slayer)  –  1 kW

Italy
In Italy there are 4 radio stations that serve 5 bases and more than 14 cities:
 AFN The Eagle – 106.0 FM
 Monte Serra – AFN Livorno (After the closing of AFN Livorno it will be transmitted AFN Vicenza) in Pisa (Camp Darby), Livorno, Viareggio and the surrounding area.
 Monte Venda – AFN Vicenza in Vicenza (Caserma Ederle and Del Din), Verona, Venezia, Padova, Sud Treviso and the surrounding area.
 Aviano – AFN Aviano in Pordenone (Aviano Air Base), Udine and the surrounding area.
 AFN Naples – 107.9 FM Collina dei Camaldoli Naples (Naval Base), Caserta, South Avellino and the highest zones (there are interferences)
 AFN Sigonella – 105.9 FM in Catania (Naval and Air Base), North Siracusa and the surrounding area.
 
 AFN Power Network
 Monte Serra – AFN Livorno Power (After the closing of AFN Livorno it will be transmitted AFN Vicenza) in Pisa (Camp Darby), Livorno, Viareggio and the surrounding area.
 Monte Venda – AFN Vicenza Power in Vicenza (Caserma Ederle and Del Din), Verona, Venezia, Padova, Sud Treviso and the surrounding area.
 Collina dei Camaldoli – AFN Naples Power in Naples (Naval Base), Caserta, South Avellino and the highest zones (there are interferences).
 Sigonella – AFN Sigonella Power in Catania (Naval and Air Base), North Siracusa and the surrounding area.
 Aviano – AFN Aviano Power in Pordenone (Aviano Air Base), Udine and the surrounding area.

AFN Italy, has been serving Americans that live on American Bases in Pisa, Vicenza, Aviano, Napoli and Sigonella, since 1983.

Japan
 648 kHz AM
 Camp Kinser: Urasoe, Okinawa. 10 kilowatts (kW).
 810 kHz AM
 Yokota Air Base: Western Tokyo. 50 kW transmitted from Wakō, Saitama. Serves the Greater Tokyo Area. Station uses the on-air ID "Eagle 810".
 1575 kHz AM
 Marine Corps Air Station Iwakuni: Iwakuni, Yamaguchi. 1 kW. Station uses the on-air ID "Power 1575".
 Misawa Air Base: Misawa, Aomori. 600 W.
 United States Fleet Activities Sasebo: Sasebo, Nagasaki. 250 W.
 89.1 MHz FM
 Kadena Air Base: Kadena, Okinawa. 20 kW. Station uses the on-air ID "Wave 89".
 US Television channel 11
 Camp Foster: Okinawa.

Netherlands
Radio: AFN Soesterberg 1964–1993 (former location at grid 52°7'25"N 5°15'13"E) Transmissions ceased at the dissolution of USAF 32nd TFS
 AM – AFRS Soesterberg (1140 kHz syndicated 1964–1972 from AFN Bremerhaven) 5 kW
 FM – AFN Eagle Radio (93.1 MHz live & syndicated 1973–1994 from Camp New Amsterdam/Soesterberg airbase) 0.015 kW
The morning "Touch and Go" show from 5–9 am and the afternoon "Afterburner" show from 3–6 pm were live. The rest of the hours was syndicated from AFN Frankfurt.

Television: AFN Benelux syndicated (early 1980s only UHF channel 80 NTSC)

Currently active radio & TV:

 107.9 MHz FM
 Volkel Air Base (AFN Benelux)

Saudi Arabia
Table of AFN-transmitters in Saudi Arabia. Table may be incorrect and incomplete. Please correct and expand if necessary.

FM

The AFN FM Transmitters in Saudi Arabia are managed by the U.S. military.

Spain

Radio:
AFN Rota Radio – The Eagle
 102.5 FM: Naval Station Rota (5.0 kW)
 92.1 FM: Morón Air Base in Morón de la Frontera, Seville. (0.015 kW)

South Korea

Television

NOTE:  All over-the-air television broadcasts in South Korea ended in May 2012.  The following are previous stations.
 Channel 2 (VHF)
 Chuncheon, Gangwon (100 W)
 Jinhae, South Gyeongsang (100 W)
 Channel 12 (VHF)
 Daegu, North Gyeongsang (Camp Walker, Camp Henry, Camp Carroll) (1 kW)
 Channel 19 (UHF)
 Paju-ri, Gyeonggi
 Channel 34 (UHF) (former Channel 2 VHF)
 Yongsan-gu, Seoul (USAG Yongsan, Camp Market, K-16 Airbase) (30 kW)
 Channel 49 (UHF)
 Dongducheon, Gyeonggi (Camp Red Cloud, Camp Casey, Camp Stanley) (1 kW)
 Munsan, Gyeonggi (5 kW)
 Songtan, Gyeonggi (Osan Air Base, USAG Humphreys) (1005 W)
 Gunsan, North Jeolla (Kunsan Air Base...) and Gwangju (2.5 kW)
 Waegwan, North Gyeongsang (Camp Carroll, South Korea) (100 W)
 Channel 58 (UHF)
 Uijeongbu, Gyeonggi (Camp Red Cloud, Camp Sears, Camp Stanley) (100 W)
 Pyeongtaek, Gyeonggi (USAG Humphreys) (100 W)
 Wonju, Gangwon (100 W)

AM Radio (Thunder AM)
 1440 kHz
 Daegu, North Gyeongsang (Camp Walker, Camp Henry, Camp Carroll) (5 kW)
 Waegwan, North Gyeongsang (Camp Carroll, South Korea) (250 W)
 1161 kHz
 Uijeongbu, Gyeonggi (Camp Red Cloud, Camp Stanley, Camp Jackson) (250 W)
 1197 kHz
 Dongducheon, Gyeonggi (Camp Red Cloud, Camp Casey, Camp Stanley, Camp Jackson) (1 kW)
 1260 kHz
 Busan, South Gyeongsang (5 kW)
 1359 kHz
 Songtan, Gyeonggi (Osan Air Base, USAG Humphreys) (1 kW)
 1440 kHz
 Munsan, Gyeonggi and Paju-ri, Gyeonggi (5 kW)
 Chuncheon, Gangwon (250 W)
 Pyeongtaek, Gyeonggi (USAG Humphreys) (1 kW)
 Wonju, Gangwon (250 W)
 Gunsan, North Jeolla (Kunsan Air Base) (1 kW)
 1512 kHz
 Jinhae, South Gyeongsang (250 W)
 Pohang, North Gyeongsang (250 W)
 Jeju (50 W)
 1530 kHz
 Yongsan-gu, Seoul (USAG Yongsan, Camp Market, K-16 Airbase) (5 kW)

FM Radio (AFN Eagle)
 88.1 MHz
 Busan, South Gyeongsang (250 W)
 88.3 MHz
 Dongducheon, Gyeonggi (Camp Red Cloud, Camp Casey, Camp Stanley) (250 W)
 Pyeongtaek, Gyeonggi (USAG Humphreys) (50 W)
 Wonju, Gangwon (50 W)
 88.5 MHz
 Uijeongbu, Gyeonggi (Camp Red Cloud, Camp Stanley, Camp Jackson) (100 W)
 Munsan, Gyeonggi and Paju-ri, Gyeonggi (50 W)
 Chuncheon, Gangwon (50 W)
 Songtan, Gyeonggi (Osan Air Base, USAG Humphreys) (30 W)
 Gunsan, North Jeolla (Kunsan Air Base) (50 W)
 Gwangju, South Jeolla (505 W)
 Daegu, North Gyeongsang and Waegwan, North Gyeongsang (Camp Walker, Camp Henry, Camp Carroll)(1 kW)
 Jinhae, South Gyeongsang (50 W)
 102.7 MHz
 Yongsan-gu, Seoul (USAG Yongsan, Camp Market, K-16 Airbase...) (5 kW)

resource:

Turkey
Radio:
AFN Incirlik – The Eagle
 1590 AM: Incirlik Air Base, 5 W
 107.1 FM: Incirlik Air Base

Shortwave (USB) 
The last known confirmation of AFN using its shortwave frequencies was in the mid-2010s. Current (2022) bandscans show no signal on any of AFN's frequencies.

 Diego Garcia:
 12.579 MHz daytime
  4.319 MHz nighttime
 Guam:
 13.362 MHz daytime
  5.765 MHz nighttime
 Key West, Florida:
 12.1335 MHz day & night
  7.811 MHz day & night 
  5.4465 MHz day & night
 Pearl Harbor, Hawaii
 10.32 MHz daytime
  6.35 MHz nighttime

See: AFN Shortwave Frequencies

See also

 Chris Noel
 AFN Berlin
 British Forces Broadcasting Service
 Canadian Forces Radio and Television
 DoD News Channel
 Far East Network
 Israel Army Radio
 Radio Forces Françaises de Berlin
 Radio Wolga
 Zvezda (TV channel)

References

Further reading

 History of AFRTS: The first 50 years. U.S. Government Printing Office (1993).
 Patrick Morley: 'This Is the American Forces Network': The Anglo-American Battle of the Air Waves in World War II. Praeger Publishing (2001).
 Trent Christman: Brass Button Broadcasters: A Lighthearted Look at Fifty Years of Military Broadcasting. Turner Publishing (1992).

External links

 
 Armed Forces Network, Europe at usarmygermany.com
 Armed Forces Network, Europe 
 AFN Go, AFN Europe
 Armed Forces Network, Pacific 
 AFN Go, AFN Pacific
 AFN Bavaria livestream

 
1942 establishments in England
Direct broadcast satellite services
English-language radio stations
English-language television stations in the United States
International broadcasters
Mass media of the military of the United States
Organizations established in 1942
Military units and formations in Maryland
Peabody Award winners
Radio during World War II
Radio in Asia
Radio in Europe
Television in Asia
Television in Europe
Television networks in the United States
United States Department of Defense agencies
Event management companies